Acrobasis caribbeana is a species of snout moth in the genus Acrobasis. It was described by Jay C. Shaffer in 1978. It is found on Dominica.

References

Moths described in 1978
Acrobasis
Moths of the Caribbean